The enzyme acetylesterase catalyzes the reaction 

an acetic ester + H2O  an alcohol + acetate

This enzyme belongs to the family of hydrolases, specifically those acting on carboxylic ester bonds.  The systematic name of this enzyme class is acetic-ester acetylhydrolase. Other names in common use include C-esterase (in animal tissues), acetic ester hydrolase, chloroesterase, p-nitrophenyl acetate esterase, and Citrus acetylesterase.

Structural studies

References 

 
 
 

EC 3.1.1
Enzymes of known structure